The following is a list of achievements of esports organization Gambit in CS:GO.

Achievements 
Bold denotes a CS:GO Major
Italics denote a CS:GO Minor / RMR events

2016 
 1st - CIS Minor Championship - Columbus 2016
 9–12th - MLG Major Championship: Columbus 2016
 5–8th - ESL One: Cologne 2016
 11–14th - ELEAGUE Season 1
 1st - Adrenaline Cyber League
 1st - Acer Predator Masters Season 3
 1st - DreamHack Open Winter 2016

2017 
 5–8th - ELEAGUE Major 2017
 5–8th - DreamHack Masters Las Vegas 2017
 2nd - cs_summit Spring 2017
 1st - DreamHack Open Austin 2017
 1st - PGL Major: Kraków 2017
 3rd–4th - DreamHack Masters Malmö 2017
 7–8th - EPICENTER 2017
 5–6th - Intel Extreme Masters XII - Oakland
 3rd–4th - DreamHack Open Winter 2017
 1st - Asus ROG Masters 2017 Grand Finals

2018 
 9–11th - ELEAGUE Major: Boston 2018
 9–12th - Intel Extreme Masters XII - World Championship
 3rd–4th - DreamHack Masters Marseille 2018
 3rd–4th - DreamHack Open Tours 2018
 3rd–4th - Adrenaline Cyber League 2018
 3rd–4th - DreamHack Open Summer 2018
 13–16th - ESL One: Cologne 2018
 3rd–4th - Intel Extreme Masters XIII - Shanghai
 20th–22nd - FACEIT Major: London 2018
 3rd–4th - ESL One: New York 2018

2019 
 4th - CIS Minor Championship - Katowice 2019

2020 
 5th - IEM XV - New York Online: CIS
 1st - Nine to Five #6
 1st - DreamHack Open November 2020
 5–8th - DreamHack Masters Winter 2020: Europe
 3rd–4th - DreamHack Open December 2020
 1st - Nine to Five #7

2021 
 3rd–4th - DreamHack Open January 2021: Europe
 2nd - Snow Sweet Snow #1
 1st - Intel Extreme Masters XV - World Championship
 1st - Pinnacle Cup
 2nd - ESL Pro League Season 13
 2nd - DreamHack Masters Spring 2021
 1st - EPIC CIS League Spring 2021
 1st - IEM XVI - Summer
 1st - BLAST Premier: Spring Finals 2021
 2nd - StarLadder CIS RMR 2021
 5–6th - IEM Cologne 2021
 5–8th - ESL Pro League Season 14
 2nd - Intel Grand Slam Season 3
 1st - IEM XVI Fall: CIS
 3rd–4th - PGL Major Stockholm 2021
 1st - V4 Future Sports Festival 2021
 5–6th - IEM XVI - Winter
 2nd - BLAST Premier: World Final 2021

2022 
 1st - Funspark ULTI 2021
 5–6th - Intel Extreme Masters XVI - Katowice

References 

Gambit